G. Wayne Thomas is a New Zealand-born Australian based musician, producer and songwriter. His single "Open Up Your Heart"/"Morning of the Earth" reached #21 on the Australian Singles chart.

Thomas was born in Auckland, New Zealand and moved to Australia in 1968 and started writing music for commercials. He signed with Warners, released a single in 1971 and started working as a producer. He produced the soundtrack to the surf movie Morning of the Earth, changing what was going to be a Tamam Shud album into a various artists record. It featured Tamam Shud, Terry Hannigan, Brian Cadd, John J. Francis, Peter Howe and three G. Wayne Thomas tracks. The soundtrack was released in 1972 along with a single from the album, "Open Up Your Heart"/"Morning of the Earth".

In 1972 he put together a band called Duck to record an album. The band originally comprised Jon English, Bobbi Marchini, John Robinson, Bobby Gebert, Larry Duryea, Teddy Toi and Steve Webb. They released an album of covers, Laid, which was produced by Thomas.

Thomas started his own label, Warm & Genuine, and released a self-titled album in 1973. He followed that up with a soundtrack for Crystal Voyager. For this he put together a studio band called the Crystal Voyager Band. It consisted of Thomas, Bobby Gebert, Mick Liber, Rod Coe and John Proud. His last release on Warm & Genuine was in 1975 after which he signed with Polydor.

In 1979-80 he worked in a duo with Peter Bailey and together they released an album, Missing Persons and four singles.

Discography

Albums

EPs

Singles

References

New Zealand musicians
Australian musicians
Living people
Year of birth missing (living people)